Thomas Rivers (September 18, 1819 – March 18, 1863) was an American politician and a member of the United States House of Representatives for the 10th congressional district of Tennessee.

Biography
Rivers was born in Franklin County, Tennessee on September 18, 1819. He received an academic education and attended La Grange College in Alabama. He studied law, was admitted to the bar in 1839.

Career
Rivers began his practice of law in Somerville, Tennessee. He also served for many years in the state militia ranking as a brigadier general.

Elected as the candidate of the American Party to the Thirty-fourth Congress, but not a candidate for renomination in 1856, Rivers served from March 4, 1855 to March 3, 1857.

Resuming his profession, Rivers continued the practice of law until his death on his plantation near Somerville, Tennessee.

Death
Rivers died on March 18, 1863. He is interred in Somerville Cemetery, Somerville, Tennessee.

References

External links 
 
 

1819 births
1863 deaths
People from Franklin County, Tennessee
Know-Nothing members of the United States House of Representatives from Tennessee
Tennessee Know Nothings
19th-century American politicians
Members of the United States House of Representatives from Tennessee